Leadway Assurance Company, also known as Leadway, is a Nigerian insurance corporation headquartered in Lagos, Nigeria. It is one of Nigeria's largest insurance companies. Leadway provides commercial and personal property and casualty insurance, travel insurance and life insurance.

History
Leadway was established in 1970 by Sir Hassan O. Odukale. It commenced business in 1971 and started out as a direct motor insurer. It expanded into other areas of general business until it became a composite company underwriting both life and general insurance business. The company's financial capacity grew over time, and can now underwrite risks of very high magnitude as regards heavy industries, such as Oil and Gas and big manufacturing concerns. It also offers subsidiary financial services like Bond, Secured Credit, Miscellaneous financial losses and Fund/Portfolio management.

The company is now being run by Tunde Hassan-Odukale.

External links

References

Nigerian companies established in 1970
Companies based in Lagos
Financial services companies established in 1971
Insurance companies of Nigeria